Market House Square District is a national historic district located at Fayetteville, Cumberland County, North Carolina.  It encompasses 11 contributing buildings in the central business district of Fayetteville.  The district includes six storefronts and a major store, an office building, a former Knights of
Pythias Building, and the First Citizen's Bank Building, all of which date between 1884 and 1926 and ring the separately listed Market House. The First Citizen's Bank Building was designed by architect Charles C. Hartmann and built in 1926.

Although all of the original buildings were lost in Fayetteville's devastating fire of 1831, replacements were built at the same locations, with one exception. There was no sense in rebuilding the former capitol, although when the capitol in Raleigh also burned soon afterwards some in Fayetteville had fantasies of getting the capital moved back. Instead they built a Market House, with covered space for commercial activities—since all the stores in Fsyetteville had been burned. Above it were meeting rooms, where the town and county business could be done. It remained the center of Fayetteville.

The district was listed on the National Register of Historic Places in 1983. It is incorporated into the Fayetteville Downtown Historic District.

References

Historic districts on the National Register of Historic Places in North Carolina
Victorian architecture in North Carolina
Buildings and structures in Fayetteville, North Carolina
National Register of Historic Places in Cumberland County, North Carolina